Donald Booth may refer to:

 Donald E. Booth (born 1954), American diplomat
 Donald Prentice Booth (1902–1993), U.S. Army general